CD-198 or No. 198 was a Type D escort ship of the Imperial Japanese Navy during World War II.

History
She was laid down on 31 December 1944 at the Nagasaki shipyard of Mitsubishi Heavy Industries for the benefit of the Imperial Japanese Navy and launched on 26 February 1945. On 11 March 1945, she was completed and commissioned. On 15 August 1945, Japan announced their unconditional surrender and she was turned over to the Allies in September 1945. On 5 October 1945, she was struck from the Navy List. On 1 December 1945, she was assigned to the Allied Repatriation Service.

On 31 July 1947, she was ceded to the Republic of China as a war reparation and renamed Hsian.

In 1949, she was taken over by the People's Republic of China.

References

Bibliography

1945 ships
Type D escort ships
Ships built by Mitsubishi Heavy Industries
Ships of the Republic of China Navy
Naval ships of China